Sweetest Day is a holiday that is celebrated in the Midwestern United States, in parts of the Northeastern United States, in Arizona, and in Florida on the third Saturday in October. It is a day to share romantic deeds or expressions, and acts of charity and kindness. Sweetest Day has also been referred to as a "Hallmark holiday" or a "concocted promotion" created by the candy industry solely to increase sales of sweets.

Origin

The first Sweetest Day was on October 10, 1921, in Cleveland. The Cleveland Plain Dealer's edition of October 8, 1922, which chronicles the first Sweetest Day in Cleveland, states that the first Sweetest Day was planned by a committee of 12 confectioners chaired by candymaker C. C. Hartzell. The Sweetest Day in the Year Committee distributed over 20,000 boxes of candy to "newsboys, orphans, old folks, and the poor" in Cleveland. The Sweetest Day in the Year Committee was assisted in the distribution of candy by some of the biggest movie stars of the day including Theda Bara and Ann Pennington.

There were also several attempts to start a "Sweetest Day" in New York City, including a declaration of a Candy Day throughout the United States by candy manufacturers on October 8, 1922.  In 1927, The New York Times reported that "the powers that determine the nomenclature of the weeks of October" decreed that the week beginning on October 10, 1927, would be known as Sweetest Week. On September 25, 1937, The New York Times reported under Advertising News and Notes that The National Confectioners Association had launched a "movement throughout the candy industry" to rank Sweetest Day with the nationally accepted Mother's Day, Father's Day, and St. Valentine's Day.

In 1940, another Sweetest Day was proclaimed on October 19. The promotional event was marked by the distribution of more than 10,000 boxes of candy by the Sweetest Day Committee. The candy was distributed among 26 local charities. 225 children were given candy in the chapel at the Society for Prevention of Cruelty to Children  on October 17, 1940. 600 boxes of candy were also delivered to the presidents of the Jewish, Protestant and Catholic Big Sister groups of New York.

Regional importance
Retail Confectioners International describes the observance as "much more important for candymakers in some regions than in others (Detroit and Cleveland being the biggest Sweetest Day cities)".  The popularity in Detroit was greatly perpetuated by the Sanders Candy Company. Frederick Sanders of Detroit was a large promoter of the holiday.  In 2006, Hallmark marketed 151 greeting card designs for Sweetest Day. American Greetings marketed 178.

Sweetest Day observance is still most prevalent in the Great Lakes region, where the holiday originated, including Illinois, Indiana, Michigan, Ohio, and Wisconsin.  According to Hallmark, "the once-regional celebration of Sweetest Day has spread throughout the country."  In addition to those states where it is "most prevalent", Sweetest Day is celebrated by communities in Arizona, California, Florida, Kentucky, Missouri, New York, North Dakota, Pennsylvania, South Dakota, Texas, Washington, and West Virginia, bringing the total to 17 states.

Criticism
Since Sweetest Day was invented by commercial interests which stood to profit from such a holiday, dissenting Cleveland residents refer to it as a "Hallmark holiday" (although it was not invented by the Hallmark Cards company).

References

Further reading

External links

Survey of 1,000 Americans on Sweetest Day Confectionaries 

Recurring events established in 1921
Culture of the Midwestern United States
Public holidays in the United States
Holidays and observances by scheduling (nth weekday of the month)
October observances
Saturday observances
Days celebrating love